João Miguel Barbosa Moreira (born 2 March 1998) is a Portuguese professional footballer who plays for S.C. Freamunde as a defender.

References

External links

Portuguese League profile 

1998 births
Living people
Portuguese footballers
Association football defenders
Liga Portugal 2 players
S.C. Freamunde players